John Henry Hallows (16 February 1907 – August 1963) was an English professional footballer who played much of his career at Bradford City where he still is one of the club's top goal-scorers.

Career
Hallows was born in Chester but moved to Liverpool as an orphan by the time he was five years old. He started his footballing career with Liverpool Bluecoats, then Willenhall Swifts, before moving to the Football League with West Bromwich Albion. He was released after just a few months and instead returned to non-league with Grays Thurrock. In November 1930 he was signed by Bradford City for £600. He finished his first two seasons at Valley Parade as the club's top goal-scorer with 19 and 21 goals respectively, all in the league, including five against Barnsley in a 9–1 triumph. He added another 29 goals in his next two seasons, but just five in his final two. His appearances in his last season, however, were restricted because of a two-month suspension imposed after being sent off in a Midland League game against Rotherham United.

He left Bradford for Barnsley in March 1936, having spent his entire Bradford career in Division Two and amassed 74 league goals and five in the FA Cup in a total of 173 appearances. But he made just 13 league appearances, scoring four goals, at Barnsley before he retired.

He set up his own tailoring trade in Walkden, near Bolton, before he died in August 1963.

References

1907 births
1963 deaths
Sportspeople from Chester
English footballers
Association football forwards
Willenhall F.C. players
West Bromwich Albion F.C. players
Grays Thurrock United F.C. players
Bradford City A.F.C. players
Barnsley F.C. players
English Football League players